Kondavil railway station ( Kōṇṭāvil toṭaruntu nilaiyam) is a railway station in the town of Kondavil in northern Sri Lanka. Owned by Sri Lanka Railways, the state-owned railway operator, the station is part of the Northern Line which links the north with the capital Colombo. The popular Yarl Devi service calls at the station. The station was not functioning between 1990 and 2015 due to the civil war. The Northern Line between Jaffna and Kankesanthurai was re-opened on 2 January 2015.

Services
The following train services are available from/to the station:

References

Railway stations in Jaffna District
Railway stations on the Northern Line (Sri Lanka)